Nonde is an administrative ward in the Mbeya Urban district of the Mbeya Region of Tanzania. In 2016 the Tanzania National Bureau of Statistics report there were 2,742 people in the ward, from 2,488 in 2012.

Neighborhoods 
The ward has 4 neighborhoods.
 Mbwile A
 Mbwile B
 Mwalingo
 Nonde

References 

Wards of Mbeya Region